Miss Charm is an international beauty pageant based in Vietnam with the mission of promoting culture, tourism and educational activities.

The current Miss Charm is Luma Russo from Brazil, who was crowned on February 16, 2023, in Ho Chi Minh City, Vietnam.

History
Miss Charm was founded in October 8, 2019 as Miss Charm International, then rebranded as Miss Charm. The contest is owned by Elite Vietnam, an entertainment company based in Ho Chi Minh City, Vietnam.

However, due to the outbreak of COVID-19, the first Miss Charm Pageant was postponed several times in two years. On November 17, 2022, at Lotte Hotel Saigon, a press conference to re-launch the contest after the delay. On this occasion, the name of the contest was officially shortened to just "Miss Charm" and the prize for the winner of the first edition was revealed to be $100,000.

Crowns of Miss Charm
The official crown of Miss Charm was made by Mexican jewelry designer, Ricardo Patraca, at an estimated cost of US$150,000.The crown is inspired by the bay leaf which is a symbol of victory and glory. The crown stands out in white and red tones, set with more than 6,000 precious stones, symbolizing love, emotion, courage and passion. This crown is also handcrafted from Mexican silver and finished with rhodium. The leaf image on the crown symbolizes the elements of purity, simplicity, freshness and vitality.

Editions
The following is a list of Miss Charm pageant edition and information.

Titleholders

List of Miss Charm winners

Countries by number of wins

List of Miss Charm Runners-Up

See also 

 List of beauty contests

References

External links 

 

Miss Charm
International beauty pageants
Recurring events established in 2019
2019 establishments in Vietnam